Treasury Department Federal Credit Union (TDFCU) is a credit union headquartered in Washington, D.C., chartered and regulated under the authority of the National Credit Union Administration (NCUA) of the U.S. federal government.

History
The Treasury Department Federal Credit Union (TDFCU) founded in 1935, is a full service financial institution with a voluntary Board of Directors that is elected by the members. Each member is an owner of the credit union with an equal vote.

Membership
Membership in the Treasury Department Federal Credit Union is available to employees of the US Treasury Department, Department of Homeland Security, U.S. Courts, United States Securities and Exchange Commission(SEC), as well as persons who live, work (or regularly conduct business), worship, or attend school in, and businesses and other legal entities located in, Washington, D.C.

In addition, once an eligible member joins, their family members are eligible.  Family members include spouse/partner, parents, grandparents, siblings, children (includes adopted, foster, and stepchildren) and grandchildren.

Services
TDFCU offers the typical suite of account services offered by most financial institutions, including savings accounts, checking accounts, IRA accounts, and certificates of deposit. The savings product is named "Share Savings" to reflect the fact that a member's initial savings deposit ($10) literally represents their share of ownership in the credit union. TDFCU also offers members consumer loans, credit cards, vehicle loans, education loans, mortgages and home equity lines of credit.

Branch locations
 
The Treasury Department Federal Credit Union has nine full service branches. Six of the branches are located in the District of Columbia, while the remaining three branches are located in Newington, VA; Prince George's County, MD; and Long Beach, CA.

Losses
TDFCU and several other credit unions were victimized when U.S. Mortgage Corporation sold mortgages that it managed on behalf of the credit union to Fannie Mae and kept the money.

TDFCU lost more than $500,000 in the first nine months of 2008, and some other District of Columbia credit unions also experienced losses.

References

External links
Official Website
TDFCU Mortgage Web Center
National Credit Union Administration

Credit unions based in Washington, D.C.
Banks established in 1935
1935 establishments in Washington, D.C.